Castillo de Olvera is located in Olvera in the province of Cádiz, southern Spain. It was built in the late 12th century as part of the defensive system of the Emirate of Granada. It was declared a Bien de Interés Cultural monument in 1982.

External links

 Page on Andalucia Rustica

Bien de Interés Cultural landmarks in the Province of Cádiz
Castles in Andalusia
Buildings and structures completed in the 12th century